In molecular biology, snoRNA U41 (also known as SNORD41) belongs to the C/D box class of snoRNAs. It is predicted to guide 2'O-ribose methylation of the large 28S rRNA on residue U4276.

References

External links 
 

Small nuclear RNA